Fade Up is a song released in June 2022 by producer Zeg P in collaboration with Belgian rapper Hamza and French rapper SCH. It peaked at number one in the French Singles Chart where it stayed for three non-consecutives weeks.

Charts

Certifications

References

2022 singles
2022 songs
French-language songs
SNEP Top Singles number-one singles